The Treasure of Pionsat is a collection of Arverni coins discovered in 1852 at Pionsat in Puy-de-Dôme, France. The coins date from the middle of the first century BC. 

The treasure had been buried a few kilometers from the open pit gold mines at Combrailles . At the time of the 1852 discovery, 200 to 300 coins were counted, but most of them soon vanished. 
Today only 51 certified coins exist in public and private collections.
Twenty-one of the coins are at the National Library of France.

The discovery provides the most important historical source for the coinage of Arverni, especially of those attributed to Vercingétorix . A study by Sylvia Nieto and Jean-Noël Barrandon regarding Arverni coinage reported that there are 137 extant coins, 27 in the name of Vercingétorix. Of these, 16 are part of this treasure.

Sources

 
Treasure troves of France